The Lee Strasberg Theatre & Film Institute (originally the Lee Strasberg Theatre Institute) is an acting school founded in 1969 by actor, director, and acting teacher Lee Strasberg. The Institute is located in Union Square on East 15th Street, also known as Lee Strasberg Way, in New York, New York. The school has a secondary campus located in Los Angeles, California.

For more than 40 years, the Institute has held a partnership with New York University's Tisch School of the Arts, where students can earn a Bachelor of Fine Arts degree.  The Institute is under the artistic direction of Anna Strasberg, Lee Strasberg's widow. Students at the Lee Strasberg Theatre & Film Institute learn method acting, an acting technique created and developed by Strasberg.

History 
In 1931, Lee Strasberg co-founded the Group Theatre, hailed as "America's first true theatrical collective," alongside fellow directors Harold Clurman and Cheryl Crawford. In 1951, he became director of the Actors Studio in New York City, considered "the nation's most prestigious acting school," and, in 1966, he was involved in the foundation of the Actors Studio West in Los Angeles.

After almost five decades of teaching private classes and shepherding generations of actors toward success at the Actors Studio, Strasberg established his own school in 1969, open to all those interested in learning The Method. Years later, a gift from his wife Anna Strasberg established the permanent homes of the Lee Strasberg Theatre & Film Institutes in both New York and Los Angeles.

Notable alumni

Matt Adler
Akhil Akkineni
Khalilah Ali
Karen Allen
Nancy Allen
Antero Alli
Greg Anderson
Vito Antuofermo
Will Arnett
Srinivas Avasarala
Blanche Baker
Adam Bakri
Alec Baldwin
Talia Balsam
Rik Barnett
Alma Beltran
Elizabeth Berridge
Dean Biasucci
Chaz Bono
Josh Bowman
Cyrus Broacha
Rachel Brosnahan
Jim J. Bullock
Steve Buscemi
Rosanne Cash
Kiera Chaplin
Kevin Corrigan
Luciano Cruz-Coke
Ben Curtis
Kelly Curtis
Tony Dalton
Claire Danes
Rosario Dawson

Rebecca De Mornay
Laura Dern
Kim Dickens
Brenda Dickson
Matt Dillon
Caggie Dunlop
Cary Elwes
Jennifer Esposito
Chris Evans
Bridget Fonda
Jorja Fox
Benno Furmann
Teri Garr
Edith González 
Eiza González
Eric Gores
Carson Grant
Kathy Griffin
Sachin Gupta
Gilda Haddock
Linda Hamilton
Brianne Howey
Jay Huguley
Michael Imperioli
Lorenza Izzo
Oliver Jackson-Cohen
Scarlett Johansson
Amy Jo Johnson
Angelina Jolie 
Ranbir Kapoor
Janhvi Kapoor
Janice Karman
Carmen Kass
Lainie Kazan
Johnny Kemp
Brian Kerwin
Dhruv Vikram
Jiah Khan
Rahul Khanna
Callie Khouri
Prakash Kovelamudi
Lady Gaga
Inbar Lavi
Brandon Lee
John Leguizamo
Jennifer Jason Leigh
Chelsea Leyland
Sean Li
Sophia Lillis
Traci Lords
Susan Loughnane
Amy Madigan
Jean-Baptiste Maunier
Danica McKellar
William McNamara
Sienna Miller
Donna Murphy
Gianella Neyra
Valerie Niehaus
Kelli O'Hara
Jerry Orbach
Linh Dan Pham
Anne Pitoniak
Franka Potente
Tyrone Power Jr.
Linda Purl
Juan Ricondo (singer)
Yaniv Rokah
Roger Rose
Daniela Ruah
Theresa Russell
Davy Sardou
Tom Schilling
Michael Schoeffling
Omar Sharif, Jr
Hilary Shepard
Lewis Smith
Renée Felice Smith
Bonnie Somerville
Sissy Spacek
Fabian Stumm
Miles Teller
Marlo Thomas
Gianfranco Terrin
Uma Thurman
Rip Torn
Shenaz Treasurywala
Tom Villard
Christoph Waltz
Tim Williams
Chandra Wilson
Marie Windsor
Michael Wright

See also
Actors Studio
Group Theatre
Stanislavski's system

References
Explanatory notes

Citations

External links

The Lee Strasberg Theatre & Film Institute, 

Drama schools in the United States

Theatre in New York City
Education in Manhattan
Union Square, Manhattan